Sir Edmund Uvedale (died 1606), of Gussage All Saints and Holt Park, Dorset, was an English politician.

He was a Member of Parliament (MP) for Dorset in 1601.

References

16th-century births
1606 deaths
Politicians from Dorset
English knights
English MPs 1601